Irene Grootboom (c. 1969 – 2008) was a South African housing rights activist best known for her victory before the Constitutional Court in 2000. The Court found that the government had not met its obligation to provide adequate alternative housing for the residents of Cape Town's Wallacedene informal settlement. The ruling provided clear legal support for housing-rights campaigns in South Africa and elsewhere. At the time of her death in August 2008, however, Grootboom was still living in a shack.

The SJC grassroots movement in Khayelitsha established the Irene Grootboom Memorial Lecture Series in her honour.

Notes

References 
 Government of the Republic of South Africa and Others v Grootboom and Others 2001 (1) SA 46 (CC).

External links 
 The 'Grootboom' community, November 2000, 2001. 4 min. film. Focuses on a lawsuit by Irene Grootboom, includes interviews with Wallacedene residents.
 "A pity Grootboom will not be there to ask about unfulfilled promises"

1969 births
2008 deaths
South African activists
South African women activists
People from Cape Town
Shack dwellers
20th-century squatters
Squatter leaders
Housing in South Africa
Housing rights activists
21st-century squatters